The Fujifilm X-Pro2 is a mirrorless interchangeable-lens digital camera announced in January 2016. It is part of Fujifilm's X-Series of cameras, the successor to the X-Pro1. Sales began on 3 March 2016.

The X-Pro2 is the first mirrorless interchangeable-lens camera to have dual SD card slots. Fujifilm made some changes to the layout from the X-Pro1 and added a joystick.

The X-Pro2 jointly won a Camera Grand Prix Japan 2016 Editors Award.

The successor to the X-Pro2 is the Fujifilm X-Pro3 announced in October 2019.

Features

The Fujifilm X-Pro2 mirrorless camera is aimed at professional and ambitious amateur photographers. The camera body has a X mount for connecting Fujinon XF and XC lenses. The autofocus system works as a hybrid using contrast and phase detection, this allows focusing and release within 0.15 to 0.25 seconds from infinity to two meters. For manual focusing, a focus magnifier, a digital split image indicator as well as focus peaking are available to the user. The camera allows to capture 30 raw or about 140 JPEG shots at up to eight frames per second, assuming a SDXC-UHS-II memory card. The mechanical shutter allows exposure times of 30 to 1/8000 seconds, using the electronic shutter will allow shutter speeds up to 1/32,000 second.

In addition to a fixed rear LC display, the camera has a hybrid optical viewfinder. This is a combination of optical (OVF) and electronic viewfinder (EVF) and allows the photographer to superimpose information into the optical viewfinder field. A selection lever can be used to switch to the electronic viewfinder with 2.36 million pixels and 100% viewfinder coverage.

The X-Pro2 does not have automatic modes, HDR or panorama functions. Like its predecessor, the X-Pro1, it features various Fujifilm-typical film simulations. In addition, the user is provided with functions for automatic exposure, white balance, dynamic range and film simulation series.

With the built-in Wi-Fi function, the X-Pro2 can be controlled remotely via a smartphone or tablet.

Fujifilm “X-Trans” CMOS Sensor 
The camera is equipped with a Fujifilm X-Trans Sensor-III, which has an APS-C 23.6 × 15.6 mm format, a resolution of 24.3 megapixels and a pixel pitch of 3.9 µm. In contrast to Bayer CMOS sensor, this type features a different structure, which thus enables a different sampling method and eliminates the need for an optical low-pass filter (OLPF). The absence of a low-pass filter has a positive effect on the image resolution.

Key specifications
24.3-megapixel, APS-C sized X-Trans CMOS III sensor
Compatible with the Fujifilm X-mount system of lenses
ISO 200–12800, expandable to ISO 100–51200
Video/movie recording at 1080p at 60 fps, or at 4k at 30 fps (4k requires firmware 4.0 or later)
Hybrid OLED/optical viewfinder
1/8000 s mechanical shutter
Dual memory card slots (a first for any mirrorless interchangeable-lens camera)

References

External links 
Fujifilm X-Pro2 site
Another Fujifilm X-Pro2 site
Camerlabs review of the Fujifilm X-Pro2

X-Pro2
Cameras introduced in 2016